Nicrophorus nepalensis Hope, (Chinese: 尼泊爾埋葬蟲 or 橙斑埋葬蟲), commonly known as burying beetle, is widespread across tropical and subtropical countries in Asia. It belongs to the order Coleoptera and the family Silphidae, and is part of the nepalensis species-group, which is the second largest species group within the genus Nicrophorus. N. nepalensis differs from some other beetles in that it exhibits biparental care. Its role as a decomposer is crucial in the energy cycle and energy transformation in the ecosystem.

Description 
The body of N. nepalensis is shiny black and has unique elytral patterns with four separated scalloped, orange markings and black dots in both anterior and posterior fascia. The basal segment of the antennae is black and the tips are club shaped with three orange segments. Frons of female have an elliptical shape, whereas those of male are more rectangular. A distinct feature that separates male from female is the conspicuous orange spot on the clypeus near the mandible. Another feature is the post-ocular bulge found in males. Pronotal width is a common measurement of beetle size, and adult N. nepalensis can range from 3.6 to 7.0 mm, with no significant variations between male and female.

Distribution 
Based on georeferenced specimens, N. nepalensis can be found primarily in the mountainous regions in eastern Asia and the Malay Archipelago, with a distribution ranging in longitude from 73°E (Pakistan) to 149°E (Papua New Guinea) longitudinally and from 51°N (Ussuri, Russia) to 9°48′S (Papua New Guinea) latitudinally. Countries within this range includes Pakistan, India, China, Laos, Burma, Thailand, Vietnam, Taiwan, Japan, Philippines, and Malaysia.

Biology 
N. nepalensis can live up to four months, with its lifespan heavily dependent upon the availability of food source and its surrounding environmental conditions. Changing seasons and day lengths that directly influence abiotic factors such as temperature and photoperiod affect the time needed for N. nepalensis to reach sexual maturity. The interaction between such factors can trigger diapause, causing insect dormancy. Research done by Hwang and Shiao indicates that long day lengths with high temperature during summer inhibit ovarian growth where ovaries were not supplied with adequate nutrition. In addition, the interaction between temperature and humidity plays a major role in influencing microbial activity. High temperatures and high humidity accelerate carcass decomposition and allow maggots to grow faster.

There are many consequences associated with inferior quality and quantity of the carcass meat. When the food source is limited and the female still lays a large number of eggs, this leads to higher female mortality. An insufficient quantity of available carcass meat will result in reduced female fitness since there is not enough food to feed all the larvae. Additionally, an excess of larvae in one brood under constrained food source could hinder their pupation, resulting in offspring with reduced size or a lower success rate for future reproduction.

Behavior and reproduction 
N. nepalensis is carnivorous and feeds on carcasses of small vertebrates such as rodents and birds. Carcasses are crucial resources for reproduction, as beetles would deposit eggs around a buried carcass where their larval broods can feed on. Fresh carcasses are rare in the wild due to intense competition from the same or different species of burying beetle, blow flies, invertebrates and other mammals. N. nepalensis Hope is one of the few species of beetle that exhibits extensive biparental care, which includes defending the larvae against competitors and regurgitating predigested carcass to their young.

The larvae of N. nepalensis go through three instars, which are developmental stages of arthropods. After feeding off the carcass for about two weeks, the third instar larvae leave the crypt and prepare to pupate and eventually metamorphose into adults.

Habitat 
In terms of their habitat, N. nepalensis are found in different elevations as they can migrate along elevational gradients depending on their thermal optimum and the surrounding temperature. In most tropical areas, they are found at high elevations in cool temperatures. Yet, they can also be found in lower elevations likely due to their tolerance to warmer weather. Under certain circumstances such as limited resources and competitions from other insects or vertebrates, N. nepalensis would cooperate with individuals of the same species to optimize their chances of reproduction and survival. Group size differs with elevation and air temperature. In a study done by Sun et al., they discovered that cooperative groups, which were thermal generalists, were able to perform comparably high breeding success at all temperatures and elevations, whereas non-cooperative groups could only breed well at intermediate temperatures and elevations, making them thermal specialists.

References

External links 

Beetle juice turns corpses into cozy nurseries — here's how

Silphidae
Beetles of Asia
Beetles described in 1831
Beetles of Papua New Guinea
Insects of China
Insects of Pakistan
Insects of India
Insects of Laos
Insects of Vietnam
Insects of Myanmar
Insects of Thailand
Insects of Taiwan
Insects of Japan
Insects of Malaysia
Insects of the Philippines
Insects of Russia